A list of crime films released in the 1930s.

Notes

Crime films
1930s